Bertrand Piton (born August 19, 1970) is a French former professional footballer who played as a defender.

External links
 Bertrand Piton profile at chamoisfc79.fr

1970 births
Living people
Sportspeople from Besançon
French footballers
Association football defenders
FC Sochaux-Montbéliard players
FC Martigues players
Red Star F.C. players
Chamois Niortais F.C. players
Ligue 1 players
Ligue 2 players
Footballers from Bourgogne-Franche-Comté